is a Paralympic biathlete and cross-country skier. She is expected to compete for Japan at the 2014 Winter Paralympics.

References 

Cross-country skiers at the 2006 Winter Paralympics
Cross-country skiers at the 2010 Winter Paralympics
Cross-country skiers at the 2014 Winter Paralympics
Biathletes at the 2006 Winter Paralympics
Biathletes at the 2010 Winter Paralympics
Paralympic silver medalists for Japan
Paralympic bronze medalists for Japan
Biathletes at the 2014 Winter Paralympics
Paralympic cross-country skiers of Japan
Living people
Year of birth missing (living people)
Medalists at the 2006 Winter Paralympics
Japanese female biathletes
Paralympic medalists in cross-country skiing
21st-century Japanese women